Emperor Huanzong of Western Xia (1177–1206), born Li Chunyou, was the sixth emperor of the Western Xia dynasty of China, reigning from 1193 to 1206.

Reign
He was the son of Emperor Renzong, and tried to follow the policies dictated by his father. However, the high-ranking officials in the Western Xia government became more corrupt as time passed, starting the irreversible decline of the Western Xia. The rising of the Mongols under Genghis Khan began to pose threats as Mongols began raiding border villages. In 1205, Huanzong changed the name of the Western Xia capital to Zhongxing (now Yinchuan). Also in 1205, the Mongols began their first invasion of the Western Xia, pillaging and burning many outlying villages and cities. In 1206, his cousin Li Anquan, who became Emperor Xiangzong, started a coup d'état and took power from Huanzong. Huanzong died in the same year.

References 

1177 births
1206 deaths
Western Xia emperors
12th-century Chinese monarchs
13th-century Chinese monarchs
12th-century Tangut rulers
13th-century Tangut rulers